Carmen Şerban is a Romanian folk singer with over 26 albums released .

She has collaborated with many of the most popular singers, including Irina Loghin, Nicolae Guţă and Adrian Copilul Miniune. Her songs are about the traditional themes of manele; love, lust, and money. Over her 21-year career, she has gained such great popularity that she has toured not only Romania, but also the United States, Germany, Italy and Canada. Each of her album was sold in more than 100,000 exemplars, being one of the most well-known Romanian pop singers.

Partial discography
Albums:
 M-ai gasit si ai noroc
 Cantece de iarna (Colinde si cantece de petrecere)
 Sange de roman sa ai
 Vad numai oameni necajiti
 Femeia e un inger
 Fericirea azi o cant
 Carmen, Guta si Adrian
 Carmen stie
 Nu uita de cei saraci
 Jur ca n-am sa mai iubesc
 Cupidon Bum Bum
 Vreau tanar sa raman
 Nu ma uita
 Fara egal

See also
Music of Romania

References

Bibliography
Carmen Şerban official site

External links
Biografie Carmen Serban

1971 births
Living people
Place of birth missing (living people)
21st-century Romanian singers
21st-century Romanian women singers